Clinton Belmar Wager (January 20, 1920 – February 29, 1996) was a professional football and basketball player. He played in the National Football League from 1942 to 1945 for the Chicago Bears, Chicago Cardinals and the Cardinals-Pittsburgh Steelers merged team, "Card-Pitt". However, he also played in the National Basketball Association in 1949–50 for the Fort Wayne Pistons (now called the Detroit Pistons). He also played in the National Basketball League for the Oshkosh All-Stars and Hammond Calumet Buccaneers, while finishing his career with the Louisville Alumnites of the National Professional Basketball League.

College career
Prior to his professional career, Wager played basketball for Saint Mary's University. During his college career, he was an all-conference center and an individual scoring champion twice, in 1939 and 1940. He also participated in the 1941 National Invitational Tournament. He was also selected in his senior year as captain of the school's basketball team. He also played football for the school. He was elected in the schools sports hall of fame in 1977.

Career statistics

NBA
Source

Regular season

Playoffs

References

External links
Stats at Basketball Reference
Stats at Pro Football Reference
St. Mary's Athletics Hall of Fame profile

1920 births
1996 deaths
American men's basketball players
Basketball players from Minnesota
Card-Pitt players
Centers (basketball)
Chicago Bears players
Chicago Cardinals players
Fort Wayne Pistons players
Forwards (basketball)
Hammond Calumet Buccaneers players
Oshkosh All-Stars players
People from Winona, Minnesota
Players of American football from Minnesota
Saint Mary's Cardinals men's basketball players
Saint Mary's Redmen football players